Cloris Leachman (April 30, 1926 – January 27, 2021) was an American actress and comedian whose career spanned nearly eight decades. She won many accolades, including eight Primetime Emmy Awards from 22 nominations, making her the most nominated and, along with Julia Louis-Dreyfus, most awarded performer in Emmy history. She won an Academy Award, a British Academy Film Award, a Golden Globe Award, and a Daytime Emmy Award.

Born and raised in Des Moines, Iowa, Leachman attended Northwestern University and began appearing in local plays as a teenager. After competing in the 1946 Miss America pageant, she secured a scholarship to study under Elia Kazan at the Actors Studio in New York City, making her professional debut in 1948. In film, she appeared in Peter Bogdanovich's The Last Picture Show (1971) as the neglected wife of a closeted schoolteacher in the 1950s; she won the Academy Award for Best Supporting Actress and the BAFTA Award for Best Actress in a Supporting Role for her performance, and the film is widely considered to be one of the greatest of all time. She was part of Mel Brooks's ensemble cast, appearing in roles such as Frau Blücher in Young Frankenstein (1974) and Madame Defarge in History of the World, Part I (1981).

Leachman won additional Emmys for her role on The Mary Tyler Moore Show; television film A Brand New Life (1973); the variety sketch show Cher (1975); the ABC Afterschool Special production The Woman Who Willed a Miracle (1983); and the television shows Promised Land (1998) and Malcolm in the Middle (2000–06). Her other notable film and television credits include Gunsmoke (1961), The Twilight Zone (1961; 2003), Butch Cassidy and the Sundance Kid (1969), WUSA (1970), Yesterday (1981), the English-language dub of the Studio Ghibli's Castle in the Sky (1998), Spanglish (2004), Mrs. Harris (2005), and Raising Hope (2010–2014). Leachman released her autobiography in 2009, and continued to act in occasional roles until her death.

Early life
Leachman was born on April 30, 1926, in Des Moines, Iowa, the eldest of three daughters. Her parents were Cloris (née Wallace) and Berkeley Claiborne "Buck" Leachman. Her father worked at the family-owned Leachman Lumber Company. Her youngest sister, Claiborne Cary, was an actress and singer. Her other sister, Mary, was not in show business. Their maternal grandmother was of Bohemian (Czech) descent. Leachman attended Theodore Roosevelt High School.

As a teenager, Leachman appeared in plays by local youth on weekends at Drake University in Des Moines. After graduating from high school, she enrolled at Northwestern University in the School of Education.

At Northwestern, she became a member of Gamma Phi Beta and was a classmate of future comic actors Paul Lynde and Charlotte Rae. She began appearing on television and in films shortly after competing in Miss America in 1946 as Miss Chicago.

Career

Early career
After winning a scholarship in the Miss America pageant, placing in the top 16, Leachman studied acting under Elia Kazan at the Actors Studio in New York City. She had been cast as a replacement for the role of Nellie Forbush during the original run of Rodgers and Hammerstein's South Pacific. A few years later, she appeared in the Broadway-bound production of William Inge's Come Back, Little Sheba, but left the show before it reached Broadway when Katharine Hepburn asked her to co-star in a production of William Shakespeare's As You Like It. Leachman was slated to play the role of Abigail Williams in the original Broadway cast of Arthur Miller's seminal drama The Crucible. The production played four preview performances at the Playhouse Theatre in Wilmington, Delaware, from January 15–17, 1953, prior to opening on Broadway on January 22. However, Leachman left the production the day before opening night in Wilmington, with Madeleine Sherwood assuming the role. Leachman's name was heavily publicized prior to the production's opening, and her name still appeared in the printed program; a sign appeared at the box office in Wilmington noting the change.

Leachman appeared in many live television broadcasts in the 1950s, including such programs as Suspense and Studio One. She also briefly held the role of the mother of "Lassie's" second master Timmy (Jon Provost) until she was replaced late in her only season with the cast by June Lockhart due to contract disputes. She made her feature-film debut as an extra in Carnegie Hall (1947), but her first real role was in Robert Aldrich's film noir Kiss Me Deadly, released in 1955. Leachman was several months pregnant during the filming, and appears in one scene running down a darkened highway wearing only a trench coat. A year later, she appeared opposite Paul Newman and Lee Marvin in The Rack (1956). She appeared with Newman again in a brief role in Butch Cassidy and the Sundance Kid (1969).

She continued to work mainly in television, with appearances on Rawhide and in The Twilight Zone episode "It's a Good Life", as well as the sequel "It's Still a Good Life" in the 2002–2003 UPN series revival. During this period, Leachman appeared opposite John Forsythe on the anthology Alfred Hitchcock Presents in an episode titled "Premonition" (1955).

In 1956 she guest starred as "Flory Tibbs", in a complex role as an abused captive on the TV Western Gunsmoke in S2E1's "Legal Revenge".

She later appeared as Ruth Martin, Timmy Martin's adoptive mother, in the last half of season four (1957) of Lassie. Jon Provost, who played Timmy, said, "Cloris did not feel particularly challenged by the role. Basically, when she realized that all she'd be doing was baking cookies, she wanted out." She was replaced by June Lockhart in 1958.

That same year, she appeared in an episode of One Step Beyond titled "The Dark Room", with Marcel Dalio, in which she portrayed an American photographer living in Paris. In 1960, she played Marilyn Parker, the roommate of Janice Rule's character, Elena Nardos, in the Checkmate episode "The Mask of Vengeance".

In 1961, she starred as Boni, a cold-hearted woman that would sell out her man for $500 in the TV Western Gunsmoke (S6E36 - "For The Love of Money).

In 1962, she appeared in "The Nancy Davis Story" as a forlorn bar maid desperate for love on Wagon Train (S5E33), plus she co-starred in "Trial by Fire", on an episode of Laramie that same year, as well as the "Where Beauty Lies" episode of Alfred Hitchcock Presents opposite George Nader.

In 1966, she guest-starred on Perry Mason as Gloria Shine in "The Case of the Crafty Kidnapper". In late 1970, Leachman starred in one episode of That Girl as Don Hollinger's sister, Sandy.

Later career
In The Last Picture Show (1971), based on the bestselling book by Larry McMurtry, Leachman played Ruth Popper, the high-school gym teacher's neglected wife, with whom Timothy Bottoms' character has an affair. The part was originally offered to Ellen Burstyn, but Burstyn wanted another role in the film. Director Peter Bogdanovich correctly predicted during production that Leachman would win an Oscar for her performance; she won for Best Supporting Actress. 

Leachman played Phyllis Lindstrom on The Mary Tyler Moore Show. Lindstrom was a recurring character on the program for five years, and was subsequently featured in a spinoff series, Phyllis (1975–1977), for which Leachman won a Golden Globe Award. The series ran for two seasons.

In 1977, she guest-starred on The Muppet Show, episode 2.24. In 1978, she won the Sarah Siddons Award for her work in Chicago theater. In 1987, she hosted the VHS releases of Schoolhouse Rock! and portrayed the evil witch Griselda for Disney's Cannon Tales production of Hansel and Gretel. In 1986, she returned to television, replacing Charlotte Rae's character Edna Garrett as the den mother in The Facts of Life. Leachman's role as Edna's sister, Beverly Ann Stickle, could not save the long-running series, and it was cancelled two years later.

She was a voice actor in numerous animated films, including My Little Pony: The Movie (as the evil witch mother from the Volcano of Gloom), A Troll in Central Park (as Queen Gnorga), The Iron Giant, Gen¹³, and most notably as the voice of the cantankerous sky pirate Dola in Hayao Miyazaki's 1986 feature Castle in the Sky.  In 1993 she played a convincing Granny in the Penelope Spheeris film The Beverly Hillbillies. Leachman played embittered, greedy, Slavic Canadian "Grandma Ida" on the Fox sitcom Malcolm in the Middle, for which she won an Emmy Award for Outstanding Guest Actress in a Comedy Series (2006). She was nominated for playing the character for six consecutive years.

Leachman's later television credits include the Lifetime Television miniseries Beach Girls with Rob Lowe and Julia Ormond. Leachman was nominated for a SAG Award for her role as the wine-soaked former jazz singer and grandmother Evelyn in the Sony feature Spanglish opposite Adam Sandler and Téa Leoni. She had replaced an ailing Anne Bancroft in the role. The film reunited her with the Mary Tyler Moore Show writer, producer, and director James L. Brooks. That same year, she appeared with Sandler again in the remake of The Longest Yard. She also appeared in the Kurt Russell comedy Sky High as a school nurse with X-ray vision. In 2005, she guest-starred as Charlie Harper's neighbor Norma in an episode ("Madame and Her Special Friend") of Two and a Half Men.

In 2006, Leachman's performance alongside Sir Ben Kingsley and Annette Bening in the HBO special Mrs. Harris earned her an Emmy nomination for Outstanding Supporting Actress in a Miniseries or TV Movie, as well as a SAG Award nomination for Outstanding Performance by a Female Actor in a Television Movie or Miniseries. On May 14, 2006, she was awarded an honorary doctorate in fine arts from Drake University.

In 2008, Leachman was a contestant on the seventh season of Dancing with the Stars, paired with Corky Ballas, the oldest of the professionals and father of two-time champion Mark Ballas. Leachman is the oldest person to have competed on the show to date. She placed seventh in the competition.  In 2009, Leachman played alongside Jack Black in the "Stress Relief" episode of Season 5 of The Office, where the two actors appeared as love interests in a fictional movie titled Mrs. Albert Hannaday.

Also in 2006, she appeared in the American buddy beer comedy film Beerfest as Great Gam Gam Wolfhouse.

From 2010 to 2014, she starred as Maw Maw, the matriarch of the family on Raising Hope, for which she was nominated for an Emmy Award for Outstanding Guest Actress in a Comedy Series. Leachman won a record-setting eight Primetime and one Daytime Emmy Awards, in addition to having been nominated more than 20 times, including for her role on The Mary Tyler Moore Show.

In May 2015, Leachman appeared as a special guest star on the Disney Channel's Girl Meets World in an episode entitled "Girl Meets Gravity" (Season 2, Episode 1).

Leachman played the role of Memaw in the film I Can Only Imagine (2018), which is about the story behind the song of the same name by MercyMe.

One of Leachman's final roles was as Zorya Vechernyaya, one of the "old gods" who represented the evening star, in season one (2019) of the Showtime series American Gods.

Leachman appears in the film Not To Forget (2021) in her final role. The movie, directed by Valerio Zanoli, stars Karen Grassle and 5 Academy Award winners: Cloris Leachman, Louis Gossett Jr, Tatum O'Neal, George Chakiris, and Olympia Dukakis.

Work with Mel Brooks

Leachman appeared in three Mel Brooks films, Young Frankenstein (1974), in which the mere mention of the name of her character, Frau Blücher, elicits the loud neighing of horses (an homage to a cinematic villain stereotype), High Anxiety (1977) as the demented villainess and psychiatric nurse Charlotte Diesel, and Madame Defarge in History of the World: Part I.

In 1989, Leachman starred on Brooks' short-lived NBC sitcom The Nutt House in dual roles as head hotel housekeeper Mrs. Frick (a variation of the Frau Blücher character) and Mrs. Nutt, the senile owner of the hotel.

She auditioned to revive her role from Young Frankenstein in the 2007 Broadway production opposite Megan Mullally (who replaced Kristin Chenoweth) and Roger Bart. Andrea Martin was cast instead. Brooks was quoted as joking that Leachman, then 81, was too old for the role. "We don't want her to die on stage," Brooks (also 81, at the time) told columnist Army Archerd, a statement to which Leachman took umbrage. However, due to Leachman's success on Dancing with the Stars, Brooks then, doing a U-turn, reportedly asked her to reprise her role as Frau Blücher in the Broadway production of Young Frankenstein after the departure of Beth Leavel, who had succeeded Martin. The Broadway production closed before this could happen.

Publication 
Leachman's autobiography, Cloris: My Autobiography, was published in March 2009. She co-authored the bestselling book with her ex-husband George Englund.

Acting credits and awards 

Leachman was inducted into the Television Academy Hall of Fame in 2011. That same year, she was ranked number 23 on the TV Guide Network special Funniest Women on TV.
On June 20, 2014, Leachman received an honorary degree from her alma mater, Northwestern University.
In 2017, she received PETA's Lifetime Achievement Award for her dedication to animal-rights issues.
She was awarded a Star on the Hollywood Walk of Fame in the Television Category on September 22, 1980, at 6435 Hollywood Boulevard.

Personal life
From 1953 to 1979, Leachman was married to Hollywood impresario George Englund. Her former mother-in-law was character actress Mabel Albertson. The marriage produced four sons and one daughter: Bryan (died 1986), Morgan, Adam, Dinah, and George. Some of them are in show business. Her son Morgan played Dylan on Guiding Light for several years. 

The Englunds were Bel Air neighbors of Judy Garland, Sid Luft, and their children, Lorna and Joey Luft, during the early 1960s. Lorna Luft stated in her memoir Me and My Shadows: A Family Memoir that Leachman was "the kind of mom I'd only seen on TV". Knowing of the turmoil at the Luft home, but never mentioning it, Leachman prepared meals for the children and made them feel welcome when they needed a place to stay.

Leachman was also a friend of Mort Sahl and Marlon Brando, whom she met while studying under Elia Kazan in the 1950s. She introduced him to her husband, who became close to Brando, as well, directing him in The Ugly American (1963) and writing a memoir about their friendship called Marlon Brando: The Way It's Never Been Done Before (2005).

Leachman was a vegetarian and an animal rights activist. In 1997, she appeared on the cover of Alternative Medicine Digest, posing nude while body-painted with images of fruit in a parody of Demi Moore's  1991 Vanity Fair cover photo. She also posed clad in a dress made of lettuce for a 2009 PETA advertisement. In 2013, she starred in a comedic PETA ad on spay and neuter in which she opened a condom wrapper with her teeth.

Leachman's granddaughter, Anabel Englund, is a singer. In addition to Anabel, Leachman had other grandchildren, and one great-grandson, Braden.

Leachman was an atheist.

Death
On January 27, 2021, Leachman died in her sleep at her home in Encinitas, California, at the age of 94. The cause of death was a stroke and COVID-19 was a contributing factor. Her body was cremated on February 7, 2021.

Notes

References

External links

 
 
 
 
 
 

1926 births
2021 deaths
20th-century American actresses
20th-century American comedians
21st-century American actresses
21st-century American comedians
Actresses from Des Moines, Iowa
Actresses from Los Angeles County, California
American atheists
American autobiographers
American female dancers
American film actresses
American people of Czech descent
American stage actresses
American television actresses
American voice actresses
American women comedians
Best Musical or Comedy Actress Golden Globe (television) winners
Best Supporting Actress Academy Award winners
Best Supporting Actress BAFTA Award winners
Comedians from California
Dancers from Iowa
Illinois State University alumni
Miss America 1940s delegates
Northwestern University School of Communication alumni
Outstanding Performance by a Lead Actress in a Miniseries or Movie Primetime Emmy Award winners
Outstanding Performance by a Supporting Actress in a Comedy Series Primetime Emmy Award winners
Participants in American reality television series
People from Topanga, California
Western (genre) television actors
Women autobiographers
Theodore Roosevelt High School (Iowa) alumni
Deaths from the COVID-19 pandemic in California